Zhang Peimian (born October 16, 2003) is a Chinese kickboxer, currently competing in the strawweight division of ONE Championship. In October 2022, he was ranked as the tenth best bantamweight in the world by Beyond Kick.

Biography and career

Early career
Peimian made his professional debut against Li Ruidong at EM Legend 27 on January 20, 2018. He won the fight by decision. Peimian next faced Chen Jianman at the EM Legend Professional Fight League event, held on July 13, 2018. He once again won the fight by decision. Peimian faced Dmitry Pukach at Changping Cup event on September 20, 2018, in his third and final fight of the year. He won the fight by knockout.

Peimian faced Hu Haoyu at EM Legend 36 on January 12, 2019, in his first fight of the year. He won the bout by a second-round technical knockout. Peimian was booked to face Artsiom Varyvotski at the October 26, Beijing Combat event. He won the fight by a third-round technical knockout. Peimian was next scheduled to face Yang Wei at Kunlun Fight 88 on December 25, 2019. He won the fight by unanimous decision.

Peimian made two more appearances with Kunlun Fight in late 2020, following a break from the sport caused by the COVID-19 pandemic. On September 22, 2020, he fought to a draw with Zou Mingyang. A month later, on October 13, 2020, Peimian was able to knock Li Xiaochengye out with a left hook to the body. His undefeated record earned him a place in the November 26, Rise of the Warriors tournament. Although he was able to win the semifinal bout with Zewa Liluo by unanimous decision, Peimian came up short in the tournament final, as he lost a decision to Wu Zhendong.

Peimian took part in the 2021 Road To ONE China tournament, held on November 4, 2021. He was able to capture the tournament title with decision victories against Zewa Liluo in the semifinals and Hao Chenwei in the finals of the one-day tournament.

ONE Championship
Peimian made his ONE Championship debut against Josh "Timebomb" Tonna at ONE: Lights Out on March 11, 2022. He won the fight by a third-round technical knockout. His stoppage of Tonna earned Peimian a $50,000 bonus.

Zhang was booked to face Aslanbek Zikreev at ONE 159 on July 22, 2022. He won the fight by a closely contested unanimous decision.

Zhang faced Jonathan Di Bella for the vacant ONE Kickboxing Strawweight Championship at ONE 162 on October 21, 2022. Zhang was defeated by unanimous decision, in a closely contested bout, which he lost after he was knocked down with a head kick in the last round.

Peiman faced promotional newcomer Torepchi Dongak at ONE Fight Night 8 on March 25, 2023.

Titles and accomplishments
ONE Championship
 2021 Road to ONE China Tournament Winner
 Performance of the Night (One time) vs. (Josh Tonna)

Awards
 2017 EM Legend Young Fighter of the Year Award

Fight record 

|-  style="background:#;"
| 2023-03-25 || ||align=left| Torepchi Dongak || ONE Fight Night 8 || Kallang, Singapore ||  ||  ||
|-

|-  style="background:#fbb;"
| 2022-10-21 || Loss||align=left| Jonathan Di Bella || ONE 162 || Kuala Lumpur, Malaysia || Decision (Unanimous) || 5||3:00 
|-
! style=background:white colspan=9 |

|-  style="background:#cfc;"
| 2022-07-22 || Win ||align=left| Aslanbek Zikreev || ONE 159 || Kallang, Singapore || Decision (Unanimous)|| 3 || 3:00

|-  style="background:#cfc;"
| 2022-03-11|| Win ||align=left| Josh Tonna ||  |ONE: Lights Out || Kallang, Singapore || TKO (3 Knockdowns) || 2 ||2:11

|-  style="background:#cfc;"
| 2021-11-04|| Win ||align=left| Hao Chenwei|| Road to ONE, Final || |China || Decision ||5 ||3:00
|-
! style=background:white colspan=9 |

|-  style="background:#cfc;"
| 2021-11-04|| Win ||align=left| Zewa Liluo|| Road to ONE, Semi Final || |China || Decision (Unanimous) ||3 ||3:00

|-  style="background:#cfc;"
| 2021-03-27|| Win ||align=left| Liu Zhipeng|| Wu Lin Feng 516 || |China || Decision (Unanimous)||3 ||3:00

|-  style="background:#cfc;"
| 2020-12-27|| Win ||align=left| Wang Qiang|| Huya Kung Fu Festival 3 || |Zhengzhou, China || Decision (Unanimous)||3 ||3:00

|-  style="background:#fbb;"
| 2020-11-28|| Loss||align=left| Wu Zhendong|| Rise of the Warriors, Final || |Jiaxing, China || Decision ||3 ||3:00

|-  style="background:#cfc;"
| 2020-11-28|| Win ||align=left| Zewa Liluo|| Rise of the Warriors, Semi Final || |Jiaxing, China || Decision (Unanimous) ||3 ||3:00

|-  style="background:#cfc;"
| 2020-10-13|| Win ||align=left| Li Xiaochengye|| | Kunlun Fight Professional League || |China || KO (Left hook to the body)|| 2 ||0:50

|-  style="background:#c5d2ea;"
| 2020-09-22|| Draw ||align=left| Zou Mingyang|| | Kunlun Fight Professional League || |Shenzhen, China || Decision || 3||3:00

|-  style="background:#cfc;"
| 2019-12-25|| Win ||align=left| Yang Wei|| |Kunlun Fight 88 || |Yiwu, China || Decision (Unanimous) || 3 ||3:00

|-  style="background:#cfc;"
| 2019-10-26|| Win ||align=left| Artsiom Varyvotski || Beijing Combat || |Beijing, China || TKO (Punches) || 3 ||0:24

|-  style="background:#cfc;"
| 2019-01-12|| Win ||align=left| Hu Haoyu || EM Legend 36 || |Shenzhen, China || TKO (Referee stoppage) || 2 ||1:56

|-  style="background:#cfc;"
| 2018-09-20|| Win ||align=left| Dmitry Pukach || Changping Cup || |Beijing, China || KO ||  ||

|-  style="background:#cfc;"
| 2018-07-13|| Win ||align=left| Chen Jianman || EM Legend Professional Fight League || |Shenzhen, China || Decision || 3 ||3:00

|-  style="background:#cfc;"
| 2018-01-20|| Win ||align=left| Li Ruidong|| EM Legend 27 || |Kunming, China || Decision ||3  ||3:00

|-
| colspan=9 | Legend:    

|-  style="background:#cfc;"
| 2018-12-15|| Win ||align=left| Jin Ximiao || EM Legend 35|| |Emei, China || Decision || 3 ||3:00

|-  style="background:#fbb;"
| 2018-04-21|| Loss ||align=left| Sun Ao|| EM Legend 30 || |Emei, China || Decision (Unanimous) || 3 || 3:00

|-  style="background:#cfc;"
| 2018-02-10|| Win ||align=left| Wu Yancheng || EM Legend 28 || |Guang'an, China || KO (liver kick)|| 2 ||

|-  style="background:#cfc;"
| 2017-12-31|| Win ||align=left| ||  || |Jinjiang, China || KO ||  ||

|-  style="background:#cfc;"
| 2017-11-18|| Win ||align=left| Tian Shiyu || EM Legend 25 || |Sandu, China || TKO||  ||

|-  style="background:#cfc;"
| 2017-10-|| Win ||align=left| ||  || |Chengdu, China || KO || 1 ||

|-
| colspan=9 | Legend:

See also 
List of male kickboxers

References

2003 births
Living people
Chinese male kickboxers
Sportspeople from Guangxi
ONE Championship kickboxers